Sondre Jensen (born 15 November 1971) is a Norwegian former footballer who played as a midfielder.

Sondre Jensen debuted for SK Brann in the highest league in 1990 and played five times for the club in 1990 and 1991. He was also capped once for the Norway U18 national team in a game against Sweden in 1989. However he is most known for being the son of the Brann-legend Roald "Kniksen" Jensen.

He later played for Fyllingen. After his football career Sondre Jensen has worked as a postman for Posten Norge, the Norwegian postal service, in Loddefjord in Bergen.

References

Living people
1971 births
Norwegian footballers
Footballers from Bergen
Association football midfielders
Norway youth international footballers
SK Brann players
Fyllingen Fotball players